Khanchikot is a market center in Sandhikharka Municipality of Arghakhanchi District. The district lies in the Lumbini Zone of Western Nepal. The former village development committee (VDC) was converted into municipality on 18 May 2014 by merging the existing Sandhikharka, Bangla, Narapani, Khanchikot, Keemadada, Argha and Dibharna VDCs. During 1991 Nepal census it was estimated to have a total population of 4,628 individuals and had 930 houses.

References

Populated places in Arghakhanchi District